[[File:Madonna del Rosario- Saturnino Gatti.jpg|thumb|Madonna del Rosario and Donors(circa 1511), Museo Nazionale dell'Abruzzo]]

Saturnino Gatti (1463–1518) was an Italian painter and sculptor active in an early-Renaissance style.

He was born and active in L'Aquila in the Abruzzo. It has been suggested that Gatti was either a follower or pupil of Pietro Perugino. In 1477, documents suggest he was working alongside Silvestro di Giacomo da Sulmona (Silvestro dell'Aquila). In 1488, he was commissioned to paint a chapel in the church of San Domenico in L'Aquila. In 1489, he painted for the church of San Panfilo a Tornimparte. In 1490, along with Giovanni Antonio di Percossa of Rocca di Corno, with whom he had painted in the church of Abbey of the Holy Spirit at Monte Morrone, Sulmona, and in the church of Santa Caterina a Terranova di Calabria. In 1495, Gatti completes frescoes in the tribune of the church of San Panfilo a Villa Grande in Tornimparte.

WorksTranslation of the House of Loreto'' (circa 1510)

References

1463 births
1518 deaths
15th-century Italian painters
Italian male painters
16th-century Italian painters
16th-century Italian sculptors
Italian male sculptors
People from the Province of L'Aquila
Italian Renaissance painters